Jacke wie Hose (English-language title: Swings Or Roundabouts) is an East German comedy film, directed by Eduard Kubat. It was released in 1953.

Plot
After a new government law forbids women to operate heavy machinery in steel factories, a group of female workers that is determined to lift the ban proposes a competition to their male counterparts: those who will produce the greatest quantity of steel will win. The men are certain that they will be victorious. One of them, Ernst Hollup, is angered by his wife's involvement with the other team, and he demands that she will resign and become a housewife. The women develop a wagon that carries the molten iron to the steel furnace and greatly simplifies their work. They win the competition, as well as the respect of the men. The government lifts the ban.

Cast
 Irene Korb as Hilde Hollup
 Günther Simon as Ernst Hollup
 Fritz Diez as Hellwand
 Johanna Bucher as Manja
 Ruth Maria Kubitschek as Eva
 Charlotte Küter as Johanna
 Regine Lutz as Lisa
 Lieselotte Merbach as Zenzi
 Wolfgang Erich Parge as Triebel
 Herbert Richter as Meider
 Theo Shall as Mühlberger
 Edwin Marian as Peter
 Harry Hindemith as Steiger

Production
The film was planned after the East German public reacted negatively to the wave of highly ideological films released during the early 1950s. It was intended to present the ideas of socialism in a humorous fashion, and to provide entertainment for the audience.

Reception
East German film critic Leo Menter wrote that "Jacke wie Hose is a typical example for the films made in the peace-loving, Socialist countries... it is no gangster film, no opium for the masses; it is based on true life." On the other hand, Rolf Behrends,  another East German journalist, asked "why are the characters shown solely as functionaries in the factory? The film lacks any private, human side." The West German Catholic Film Service regarded Jacke wie Hose as a "propagandistic... didactic, picture." Author Andrea Rinke cited it as an early example for the expression of Feminist ideas in East German cinema, much before the subject became popular with DEFA filmmakers in the 1970.

References

External links
 
 Jacke wie Hose original 1953 poster on ostfilm.de.

1953 films
East German films
1950s German-language films
1950s feminist films
1953 comedy films
German black-and-white films
German comedy films
1950s German films